Jun-Ichiro Mukai (September 30, 1931 - January 5, 1998) is a Japanese biochemist, 
emeritus professor at faculty of agriculture, Kyushu University.

Academic works 
Mukai won the agricultural chemistry prize (Japan)  for A Digestive Endonuclease of Silkworm  in 1967.  
Mukai is a co-author of Fritz Albert Lipmann.

Life 
Mukai was born as a son of Sannoju Mukai.
After graduating Kumamoto Prefectural Seiseikou High School in Kumamoto, 
he admitted to Kyushu University.  
He received Ph.D. from Kyushu University.  
After that, he became an assistant professor, then professor of Kyushu University.  
After retirement of Kyushu University, 
he was a professor of a junior college in Kumamoto, 
but died on January 5, 1998.

Notes

Book 
 Enzymology of 3'-Squiggled Nucleotides, The Roots of Modern Biochemistry (1988), Fritz Lippmann's Squiggle and its Consequences

Research articles 
 The use of purified micrococcal nuclease in identifying the nucleotide terminus bearing a free 5'-monophosphate (1964)
 Species-specificity of nucleotide composition of ribonucleic acids from different silkworms (1965)
 A deoxyribonuclease I from rice bran (1965)
 An endonuclease from silkworm ? Purification and mode of action (1965)
 Further purification of micrococcal nuclease from the strain SA-B (1965)
 Effect of 2-thiouracil on flower initiation in rice and wheat plants grown under aseptic conditions (1966)
 A ribonuclease from UV-induced mutant of Rhizopus niveus (1966)
 An improved paper chromatographic separation of four ribonucleosides, their 3′(2′)-phosphates and 3′(2′),5′-diphosphates (1966)
 Action of silkworm endonuclease on oligoribonucleotides terminating in 3′-phosphate (1967)
 Purification and properties of acid ribonucleases from posterior silk gland of silkworm (1967)
 Mode of Action and Base Specificity of a Nuclease from Silkworm (1968)
 Paper chromatography of diribonucleoside monophosphates (1968)
 A Red, Fluorescent Protein from Silkworm (1969)
 A biliprotein from the digestive juice of Bombyx Mori L. Its purification and partial structural study of the chromophore (1971)
 Use of silkworm endonuclease in sequencing larger oligonucleotides (1972)
 Silkworm Nuclease-Its Nature and Promise (1972)
 Comparison of larval and pupal alkaline endonucleases in silkworm, Bombyx mori L. (1973)
 l-Leucine, a natural inhibitor of silkworm larval nuclease (1974)
 Acceptor Specificity of ATP: Nucleoside-5'-Phosphate Pyrophosphotransferase from Streptoniyces adephospholyticus (1978)
 NAD-and FAD-3′-pyrophosphates—enzymic synthesis and inertness (1978)
 Mapping of deoxydi- and trinucleotides liberated by the action of endonucleases from the silkworm and Aspergillus oryzae (1978)
 Streptomyces nucleotide 3′-pyrophosphokinase. Synthesis of deoxynucleotide-3′-pyrophosphates and 3′-pyrophosphoryl→3′-OH transfer activity (1978)
 Guanosine-3'-diphosphate Synthesis by Nucleotide Pyrophosphokinase-Ribonuclease Reaction (1979)
 Synthesis of deoxynucleoside-5′-tri-3′-diphosphates by Streptomyces adephospholyticus ATP: Nucleotide pyrophosphokinase (1980)
 Regulatory Effects of Purine and Pyrimidine Nucleoside 5' -Di(tri)-phosphate-3'-diphosphates on Eucaryote Protein Synthesis (1981)
 Effects of purine and pyrimidine nucleoside 5′-di (tri) phosphate-3′-diphosphates on the Escherichia coli cell-free transcription and translation activity (1982)
 Guanosine 3′-Diphosphate, a Stimulant of Glucocorticoidal Tyrosine Aminotransferase Induction in Isolated Rat Liver Cells (1982)
 Several nucleoside‐3' and/or 5'‐polyphosphates stimulate β‐galactosidase induction in escherichia coli (1982)
 Enzymic synthesis and cofactor activity of 3'-pyrophospho-coenzyme A (1983)
 Enhanced Cofactor and Allosteric Effector Activity of 3′-Pyrophospho Coenzyme A and Its Acetate (1988)
 An In-One-Bottle Enzymic Preparation of 3′- Phosphoadenosine 5′-Phosphosulfate (1989)
 Streptomyces nucleotide 3′-pyrophosphokinase are insensitive to stringent control (1989)
 Gene Cloning and Enhanced Production of Streptomyces morookaensis Nucleotide 3’- Pyrophosphokinase (1989)
 Questionable Plasmid Involvement in Streptomyces ATP Nucleotide 3’-Pyrophosphokinase Formation (1991)
 Nucleotide 2′,3′-Cyclic Monophosphokinase Action of Streptomyces Nucleotide 3′-Pyrophosphokinase (1991)
 Alternative Synthesis of Guanosine 5'-Diphosphate 3'-Diphosphate and Adenosine 5'-Diphosphate 3'-Diphosphate from Adenosine 5'-Tetraphosphate by Streptomyces ATP Nucleotide 3'-Pyrophosphokinase Catalysis (1992)
 Expression of ATP Nucleotide 3′-Pyrophosphokinase Gene from Streptomyces in Escherichia Coli and its Effects on Host Cells (1995)
 Nucleic Acid Reacts With Methlmercury, A Causative Agent of Minamata Disease (1997)

External links 
 The Roots of Modern Biochemistry: Fritz Lippmann's Squiggle and its Consequences
 Cell Control Engineering Class Home Page, Episode 1 Water Research and Science
 Semantic Scholar

1931 births
1998 deaths
Japanese biochemists
Kyushu University alumni
Academic staff of Kyushu University
Japanese expatriates in the United States